Turn It On is a 2003 album by Ronan Keating.

Turn It On may also refer to:

 Turn It On!, a 1971 album by Sonny Stitt
 Turn It On (Russell Morris album), 1976
 "Turn It On" (song), a 1981 song by Level 42
 Turn It On (Gugun and the Bluesbug album), 2007
 Turn It On, a 2010 album by Kevin Costner & Modern West
 Turn It On (EP), a 2015 EP from Eli Young Band
 "Turn It On", a song by Ladytron from their 2002 album Light & Magic
 "Turn It On", a song by Sleater-Kinney from their 1997 album Dig Me Out